Temocapril (also known as temocaprilum [Latin]; brand name Acecol) is an ACE inhibitor. It was not approved for use in the US.

It was patented in 1984 and approved for medical use in 1994.

References

ACE inhibitors
Acetic acids
Enantiopure drugs
Ethyl esters
Lactams
Prodrugs
Thiophenes
Carboxylate esters
Thiazepines